Addisoniidae is a family of sea snails, deepwater true limpets, marine gastropod mollusks in the clade Vetigastropoda (according to the taxonomy of the Gastropoda by Bouchet & Rocroi, 2005).

Subfamilies and genera 
Subfamilies and genera within the family Addisoniidae include:

Subfamily Addisoniinae Dall, 1882
 Addisonia Dall, 1882 
Subfamily Helicopeltinae Marshall, 1996
 Helicopelta Marshall, 1996

References

Further reading 
 Pilsbry; H. A. 1890-91. Manual of conchology'; structural and systematic, with illustrations of the species. Volume 12. Stomatellidae. Scissurellidae, Pleurotomariidae, Haliotidae, Scutellinidae, Addisoniidae, Cocculinidae, Fissurellidae. Academy of Natural Sciences. Philadelphia. 323 pp. + 65 pis.
 McLean J. H. (1985) The archaeogastropod family Addisoniidae Dall 1882: life habit and review of species. The Veliger 28 99-108.

 
Gastropod families